Edward Harting (March 2, 1865 – June 18, 1947) was a catcher in Major League Baseball, who played in one game on October 5, 1886 for the  St. Louis Browns.

1865 births
1947 deaths
19th-century baseball players
Major League Baseball catchers
Baseball players from Missouri
St. Louis Browns (AA) players
St. Joseph Reds players
Wichita Braves players